John Ashburnham may refer to:

John Ashburnham (died 1417), MP for Sussex
John Ashburnham (MP for Winchelsea) (by 1483–1518/23)
John Ashburnham II (by 1528–1562/63), MP for Sussex
John Ashburnham (Royalist) (1603–1671), English Member of Parliament for Hastings and Sussex, his son
John Ashburnham, 1st Baron Ashburnham (1656–1710), his grandson, English peer
John Ashburnham, 1st Earl of Ashburnham (1687–1737), his son, British Member of Parliament for Hastings
John Ashburnham, 2nd Earl of Ashburnham (1724–1812), his son, Lord Lieutenant of Sussex
Sir John Ashburnham, 7th Baronet (1770–1854) of the Ashburnham baronets

See also
Ashburnham (disambiguation)